Theodoros Berios (Greek: Θεόδωρος Μπέριος; born 21 March 1989) is a Greek professional footballer who plays as a centre-back for Super League 2 club Kalamata.

Career
Berios began playing professional football at a young age, and by 2006 at the age of 17 was a regular for the Greek U17 team and for Doxa Megalopolis. He then moved to Saronikos Aiginis, and by 2008 was playing at Thiva and for the Greek U19 team. Berios in 2009 was bought by Ionikos.

Berios is a tall and very strong football player who, considering his size, is very good with his feet. He has built a reputation in Greece as a tough tackling and hard working defender.

On 29 June 2018, Berios signed with Kisvárda.

References

External links
Profile at EPAE.org

1989 births
Living people
Ionikos F.C. players
PAS Giannina F.C. players
Association football central defenders
Kisvárda FC players
Nemzeti Bajnokság I players
Greek expatriate footballers
Expatriate footballers in Hungary
Greek expatriate sportspeople in Hungary
Footballers from Athens
Greek footballers